Three ships of the Royal Norwegian Navy have borne the name HNoMS Tyr, after the Old Norse god of single combat, victory and heroic glory Týr:

  was a  Rendel gunboat. She was launched in 1887, captured by the Germans in 1940, returned to Norway in 1945 and sold into civilian service shortly thereafter.
  was the ex-American  USS Sustain (AM-119). She was launched on 23 June 1942, and transferred to the Royal Norwegian Navy on 1 October 1959. 
  was a mine control vessel used for underwater search and recovery by the Royal Norwegian Navy from 1995 to 2014.

Royal Norwegian Navy ship names